The De Gasperi V Cabinet held office in the Italian Republic from 23 May 1948 until 27 January 1950, a total of 614 days, or 1 year, 8 months and 5 days.

Party breakdown

Beginning of term
 Christian Democracy (DC): Prime minister, 1 deputy prime minister, 9 ministers, 16 undersecretaries
 Socialist Party of Italian Workers (PSLI): 3 ministers (inc. 1 deputy prime minister), 3 undersecretaries
 Italian Liberal Party (PLI): 1 deputy prime minister, 2 ministers, 3 undersecretaries
 Italian Republican Party (PRI): 1 minister, 2 undersecretaries
 Independents: 2 ministers

End of term
 Christian Democracy (DC): Prime minister, 1 deputy prime minister, 10 ministers, 16 undersecretaries
 Italian Liberal Party (PLI): 1 deputy prime minister, 2 ministers, 3 undersecretaries
 Italian Republican Party (PRI): 1 minister, 2 undersecretaries
 Independents: 1 minister

Composition

References 

Italian governments
1948 establishments in Italy
1950 disestablishments in Italy
Cabinets established in 1948
Cabinets disestablished in 1950
De Gasperi 5 Cabinet